Västerås Castle (Västerås slott) is situated at Västerås in the province of Västmanland, Sweden.

History
The castle was originally built during the 12th century and in 1540-1544 it was rebuilt. During the latter part of the 17th century, renovation work began  under the direction of architect Mathias Spieler (ca. 1640–1691). In 1736, the castle was ravaged by fire. The castle was repaired and expanded in the mid-1740s with Carl Hårleman (1700–1753) as architect, and was completed in the 1750s. During the 1920s, restoration was carried out led by Västerås city architect Erik Hahr. In 1961, the County Administrative Board moved to a newly built country house which was renovated in 1965–66.

References

Other sources
Hedlund, Ruth (1990)  Västerås slott: fogdeborg, kungaslott, fängelse och residens  (Västerås: Västmanlands läns museum)

External links

Castles in Västmanland County
Buildings and structures in Västerås
Official residences of Swedish county governors